Platt-Cady Mansion is a historic home located at Nichols in Tioga County, New York. The original Federal structure was constructed about 1827. It is a large two-story brick mansion, modified at a later date with a visually dominant columned portico in the Greek Revival style. Also on the property is a large two-story carriage-and-horse barn. The Cady Library has occupied the building since 1941.

It was listed on the National Register of Historic Places in 1976.

References

Houses in Tioga County, New York
Houses completed in 1827
Houses on the National Register of Historic Places in New York (state)
Greek Revival houses in New York (state)
National Register of Historic Places in Tioga County, New York
1827 establishments in New York (state)